The Rolingas (also known as "stones") are an Argentine urban tribe comprising fans of the Rolling Stones and Argentine bands influenced by the aforementioned group. The musical genre associated with such bands is known as "rock rolinga" and also "Rock Chabón" (which is roughly translatable as "dude rock").

Origins
Ratones Paranoicos, with a style similar to that of the Rolling Stones, was the band that started the rock rolinga genre and rolinga urban tribe during the 1980s. The Rolling Stones had not influenced many Argentine rock bands before that point, and during the period, there was a boom of pop music and glam rock. Their style soon became a success.

The rolinga urban tribe flourished starting in the 1990s, after the Rolling Stones first played in Argentina, in 1995, during the Voodoo Lounge Tour. A number of rolinga bands emerged at this time, including Los Piojos, Viejas Locas, La 25, Los Gardelitos, Jóvenes Pordioseros, Los Guasones, and Callejeros. Their lyrics slowly departed from the classic topics of rock and roll music and focused instead on localism and the customs of poor people—but not to the point of talking about idealistic struggles or purported revolutions.

Decline
During the early- to mid-2000s, the rolinga urban tribe started to lose popularity with the advent of the cumbia villera genre and the subculture associated with it. The subculture's decline was rather slow, until it was accelerated by the República Cromañón nightclub fire, which took place during a Callejeros concert. Most of the movement's leading bands broke up or changed style, and new musical genres became prominent. Political reactions to the fire included increased safety controls at nightclubs in Buenos Aires, which made the concerts of small bands very expensive. The subculture remained in the suburbs of the Gran Buenos Aires urban area, especially the western zone, which the  Buenos Aires Province administers, and where the same controls as in the city are not enforced.

References

Bibliography
 

Argentine rock music
Musical subcultures
The Rolling Stones
1990s in music